Beyond Words (Chinese: 爱要怎么说) is a Malaysian television broadcasting produced by Mediacorp Channel 8, produced by Mediacorp Studios Malaysia. The show aired at 9pm on weekdays and had a repeat telecast at 8am the following day.  This drama stars Terence Cao, Pierre Png, Tong Bing Yu, Paige Chua, Zhang Yaodong, Shane Pow and Jayley Woo as the casts of this series. The drama will be re-aired again, on 12 January 2019 at 4:30pm.

Plot
50-year-old Liang Le Kun (Terence Cao) decides to retire as he has sufficient savings and his only son Liang Yong Xi (Shane Pow) has grown up. His younger sister Liang Le Ning (Tong Bing Yu) considers studying overseas. With his early retirement, Le Kun decides to revisit Sabah with his wife. During their trip, they ruined Xu Wen Jie’s (Pierre Png) plans by accident, causing Wen Jie to miss the chance to meet his dream girl. Le Kun’s daughter-in-law, Ou Yang Xuan Xuan (Jayley Woo), is being falsely accused of embezzling company funds. To help her, Le Kun forks out a large amount of his savings to hire a good lawyer, who turns out to be none other than Wen Jie. Wen Jie manages to win the case but requests a huge amount of payment for his work. To pay the hefty sum, Le Ning gives up her studying plans and uses her savings to pay off some of the fees. After many hardships, Le Kun finally realized that the safety and happiness of his family is what matter most in life.

Cast

Main cast

Other cast

Main Sponsor
 Tesco
 Carrefour
 Jusco 
 Giant Hypermarket
 Hero
 Hwa Thai Songmart The Store UO Fresh Eco
 Village Grocer
 Spice Up
 Family Mart 7 Eleven

See also
 List of MediaCorp Channel 8 Chinese drama series (2010s)
 List of Beyond Words episodes

References

Singapore Chinese dramas
2016 Singaporean television series debuts
2016 Singaporean television series endings
Channel 8 (Singapore) original programming